The women's team competition of the table tennis event at the 2017 Southeast Asian Games will be held from 24 to 26 August at the MiTEC Hall 7 in Kuala Lumpur, Malaysia.

Format

Team Events

(i) Team events shall be played based on the best-of-five games (four Singles and one doubles) with the following order of play:

(ii) The competition shall be conducted in two stages: Stage 1 Group Single Round Robin and Stage 2 Elimination competition comprising Semi-finals and Finals.

(iii) In Stage 1, teams shall be divided into two groups, Groups A and B. Teams in each Group shall play each other in a single round robin competition within each Group. Each match in a game shall be decided by a best-of-five sets format. Each team shall be awarded the following points:
 Two points for a win.
 One point for a loss.

(iv) The top two ranked teams from each Group shall advance to the Stage 2 cross-over Semi-finals Elimination competition as follows:
 The top ranked team in Group A shall play against the second ranked team from Group B in Semi-finals 1.
 The top ranked team in Group B shall play against the second ranked team from Group A in Semi-finals 2.
 The winners of the Semi-finals 1 and 2 will qualify to play in the Finals for the gold medal.
 There will be no playoff match for 3rd and 4th positions. Both losing Semi-Finalists will receive a joint bronze medal.

Schedule
All times are Malaysian Time (UTC+08:00).

Results

Preliminary round

Group A

Group Y

Knockout round

Semifinals

Gold medal match

References

External links
 

Women's team